Rheurdt is a municipality in the district of Cleves, in North Rhine-Westphalia, Germany.

References

External links

Kleve (district)